The Embassy of Ukraine in Prague is the diplomatic mission of Ukraine in the Czech Republic.

History 
On 8 December 1991, Czechoslovakia recognized Ukraine after the previous declaration of independence by the Supreme Soviet of Ukraine (24 August 1991), which was later approved by the referendum on 1 December 1991. The Soviet Union would eventually be dissolved by the resigning Soviet president Mikhail Gorbachev (25 December 1991) and would formally split itself into Belarus, the Russian Federation and Ukraine by signing declarations in Białowieża Forest by its respective presidents (Lukashenko, Yeltsin, Kravchuk) on 26 December 1991.

On 30 January 1992, Ukraine and Czechoslovakia established official diplomatic relations. 

After the dissolution of Czechoslovakia, Ukraine recognized and re-established diplomatic relations with both the Czech Republic and Slovakia on 1 January 1993.

Ukraine has consulates in Brno.

Ambassadors
 Maksym Slavinsky (1919)
 Mykhailo Levytsky (1921-1923)
 Roman Lubkivsky (1992-1995)
 Andriy Ozadovsky (1995-1999)
 Serhiy Ustych (1999-2004)
 Ivan Kuleba (2004-2009)
 Ivan Hrytsak (2009-2012)
 Borys Zaychuk (2012-2016)
 Yevgen Perebyynis (2017-2022)
 Vitalij Usatyj (2022-)

See also 
 Czech Republic–Ukraine relations
 Foreign relations of Czech Republic
 Foreign relations of Ukraine
 Diplomatic missions of Ukraine
 Dissolution of the Soviet Union

References

External links 
 Embassy of Ukraine in Prague 

Prague
Ukraine
Czech Republic–Ukraine relations